Makbul Shabbir Bagawan is an Indian politician and former member of the legislative assembly of the state of Karnataka.

Political career
He is a member of the Indian National Congress. He was elected from the Bijapur constituency of the Karnataka Legislative Assembly in 2013.

References 

Indian National Congress politicians from Karnataka
Karnataka MLAs 2013–2018
Living people
1969 births